Layton is a district and electoral ward of the town of Blackpool in England. The ward population at the 2011 census was 6,845.

Geography
Located roughly in Blackpool's geographical centre (although some distance from the coastal business district), Layton accounts for a relatively large part of the town's total area. Layton is bounded by the districts of Bispham (to the north), Whitegate (to the west), Grange Park (to the east) and Marton (to the south). Most of the land in this area is flat, apart from a single hill in the northeast corner.

Facilities

The north of Layton has one of Blackpool's main concentrations of shops and other businesses outside the town centre. In this area, there is also a library and several churches and public houses. Layton also has several small parks and a number of bowling greens. The main fire station for Blackpool is at the south of the district. Layton also has a large park, Kingscote Park which is the second largest park in Blackpool, and the largest park within Layton itself. Layton Cemetery is the largest in the area. Established during the town's Victorian expansion, it has a small Judaic burial area.

Layton railway station (formerly Bispham railway station) in Bispham Road is on the line that leads to Blackpool North station about a mile further to the west.

Education
Five schools are located within the district:
St Mary's Catholic Academy
Blackpool Aspire Academy
Layton Primary School
Devonshire Primary Academy, which has been rebuilt after the original building was destroyed by a fire.
Christ the King RC primary school

References

Populated places in Lancashire
Geography of Blackpool